Amata recedens  is a species of moth of the family Erebidae first described by Hippolyte Lucas in 1891. It is found in Australia.

References 

recedens
Moths described in 1891
Moths of Australia